The following television stations in the United States brand as channel 1 (though not using virtual channel 1; physical RF channel 1 on 44-50MHz was removed in 1948):

01 branded